Haplomitrium blumei is a species of liverwort from Java, Indonesia.

References

External links
 Plant List entry

Calobryales
Plants described in 1836
Flora of Java